Government College, Kariavattom, is a general degree college located in Kariavattom, Thiruvananthapuram district, Kerala, and established in 1997. It is affiliated with Kerala University and offers various courses in science subjects.

Departments

Science

UG
Physics and Computer Application 
Chemistry and Industrial Chemistry 
Geography
Statistics
Computer Science
Biochemistry
Biotechnology
Geology
Zoology
Botany
Mathematics
Chemistry

PG
Physics

Mathematics

Arts

Malayalam
English
Arbic
Hindi
French
Tamil
Sanskrit
Physical Education

Accreditation
Government College is recognized by the University Grants Commission (UGC).

References

External links
https://govtcollegekariavattom.in

Universities and colleges in Thiruvananthapuram district
Educational institutions established in 1997
1997 establishments in Kerala
Arts and Science colleges in Kerala
Colleges affiliated to the University of Kerala